The Diving competition in the 1987 Summer Universiade were held in Zagreb, Yugoslavia.

Medal overview

Medal table

References
 

1987 Summer Universiade
1987
1987 in diving